Benjamin "Ben" McKinley (born 4 March 1987) is an Australian rules footballer who previously played for the North Melbourne Football Club in the Australian Football League (AFL). He previously played for the West Coast Eagles.

Early life
McKinley played all of his junior football (U10's - U17's) with the Yarrambat Junior Football Club. He attended Ivanhoe Grammar School where he played for the Old Ivanhoe Football Club. McKinley also played for the Northern Knights in the TAC Cup competition where he attracted the eye of talent scouts.

AFL career

2005–10: West Coast Eagles
McKinley was recruited by the West Coast as the number 29 draft pick in the 2005 AFL Draft. McKinley has played predominantly as a forward for East Perth in the WAFL. He made his debut for the West Coast Eagles in Round 15 2007 against Port Adelaide.
After kicking seven goals against West Perth in Round 2, he was a late inclusion into the West Coast team for the Round 3 Western Derby and kicked three goals. The following week, he kicked four of his team's five goals against Sydney. A five-goal effort in the Eagles' loss to Port Adelaide in Round 5 saw him nominated for the Rising Star award. A notable performance was the Essendon clash late in the season, with the Bombers needing a win to get to September, McKinley single-handedly destroyed Essendon with a 7-goal man of the match performance. . He finished the season as West Coast's leading goalkicker and was named Rookie of the Year at the Club Champion Awards .

2011–2012: North Melbourne
During the 2010 AFL Trade Week, Ben McKinley requested a trade to North Melbourne Football Club. West Coast agreed to trade Ben McKinley to the North Melbourne Football Club in exchange for pick 86 in the 2010 AFL Draft.

Delisting
Ben McKinley was delisted from North Melbourne at the end of the 2012 season after failing to play a senior match.

References

External links

1987 births
Living people
Australian rules footballers from Victoria (Australia)
West Coast Eagles players
North Melbourne Football Club players
East Perth Football Club players
Northern Knights players
People educated at Ivanhoe Grammar School